John Wakefield Holder (born 19 March 1945 in Superlative, Saint George, Barbados) is an English former first-class cricketer and Test umpire.

As a player for Hampshire County Cricket Club (1968–1972) Holder was a brisk right arm medium pace bowler. In the 1970 season, Holder took 55 wickets at 23.27 runs. His best bowling figures were 6 for 49 and 7 for 79 against Gloucestershire in 1972. In 1972, Holder also took a hat-trick against Kent. His career average as a bowler saw him take 139 first-class wickets at 24.56. 

Holder became a first-class umpire in 1983 and was promoted to officiate his first test-match in 1988. He stood as umpire in eleven Test matches and nineteen One Day Internationals.  Holder was appointed by the International Cricket Council as one of five worldwide regional umpires' performance managers and is responsible for monitoring and improving the performances of umpires in Europe, the Caribbean, America and Canada.

He co-authored the book You Are The Umpire with the illustrator Paul Trevillion. The book was based on a comic strip that was included in the sports section of the British newspaper The Observer and bears similarities with You Are The Ref as both highlight unusual or difficult decisions that have to be made by sporting officials.

Holder is credited, along with Don Oslear, with the idea of a 'bowl-out' to decide a drawn match after the Tilcon Trophy final had been washed out by rain. The organisers had ordered them to think of another way of settling the match rather than the traditional and sometimes unpopular means of the toss of a coin. This idea was subsequently adopted into all England and Wales Cricket Board competitions.

In 2000, Holder was consultant on the film The Laws of Cricket, 2000 Code which was shot in Barbados. The film featured an interview with Holder and Sir Garfield Sobers, and was directed by award-winning British film director Marcus Dillistone.

Holder retired at the end of the 2009 season after 27 years as a first-class umpire.

See also
 List of Test cricket umpires
 List of One Day International cricket umpires

References

External links
 John Holder at Cricinfo
 John Holder at CricketArchive

1945 births
Living people
English Test cricket umpires
English One Day International cricket umpires
Hampshire cricketers
English cricketers